Gonzalo Suárez Morilla (Oviedo, Spain, 30 July 1934) is a Spanish writer, screenwriter and film director.

Career
In 1963 he published his first novel De cuerpo presente. His 1975 film The Regent's Wife was entered into the 9th Moscow International Film Festival. His 1991 film Don Juan in Hell was entered into the 17th Moscow International Film Festival.

In 1984 he acted as the married writer in Pedro Almodóvar's ¿Qué he hecho yo para merecer esto? (What Have I Done to Deserve This?).

In 1987 he directed Los pazos de Ulloa for TVE.

At Gijón International Film Festival in 2003, he received the Nacho Martinez Award.

Personal life
He has a younger brother cinematographer Carlos Suárez, two daughters and son, Gonzalo Suárez Girard, who is a video game director, most well known for his work on Commandos.

Filmography 

 (A) he appears as actor in small role
Source:

References

External links
Official site
Interview in  2005
 Revista Axolotl
Oviedo Express

1934 births
Living people
People from Oviedo
Film directors from Asturias
Spanish film producers
Recipients of the Civil Order of Alfonso X, the Wise
Spanish screenwriters
Spanish male writers
Male screenwriters
Best Director Goya Award winners